The Biblioteca Chelliana is a public library in Grosseto, Italy, founded in 1860 by . In 1865 it became a public library as Biblioteca comunale Chelliana. It currently occupies the Palazzo Mensini built in 1898.

Italian writer Luciano Bianciardi was the director of the library from 1951 to 1954.

References

Bibliography

External links

Libraries in Grosseto
1860 establishments
Libraries established in 1860